Blanford's bridle snake (Lycodon davisonii), also known commonly as Blanford's bridal snake, is a species of harmless snake in the family Colubridae. The species is endemic to Asia. Blanford's bridle snake is so named because its slim body resembles the bridle used to control horses.

Geographic range
L. davisonii is found in Cambodia, southern China, Laos, Myanmar, Thailand, and Vietnam.

Etymology
The specific name, davisonii, is in honor of British ornithologist William Ruxton Davison.

Habitat

Behavior
L. davisonii is terrestrial, semiarboreal, and nocturnal.

Diet
L. davisonii preys upon geckos and other small vertebrates.

Reproduction
L. davisonii is oviparous.

References

Further reading
Blanford WT (1878). "Notes on some Reptilia from the Himalayas and Burma". Journal of the Asiatic Society of Bengal 47 (2): 125–131. (Ulupe davisoni, new species, pp. 129–130). (in Latin and English).
Boulenger GA (1890). The Fauna of British India, Including Ceylon and Burma. Reptilia and Batrachia. London: Secretary of State for India in Council. (Taylor and Francis, printers). xviii + 541 pp. (Hydrophobus davisonii, new combination, p. 299).
Boulenger GA (1893). Catalogue of the Snakes in the British Museum (Natural History). Volume I. Containing the Families ... Colubridæ Aglyphæ, part. London: Trustees of the British Museum (Natural History). (Taylor and Francis, printers). xiii + 448 pp. + Plates I-XXVIII. (Dryocalamus davisonii, new combination, p. 372).
Smith MA (1943). The Fauna of British India, Ceylon and Burma, Including the Whole of the Indo-Chinese Sub-region. Reptilia and Amphibia. Vol. III.—Serpentes. London: Secretary of State for India. (Taylor and Francis, printers). xii + 583 pp. (Dryocalamus davisoni, pp. 274–275).

External links
 Flickr photo by Michael Cota
 Flickr photo by Alexandre Roux

Lycodon
Reptiles described in 1878